Cantharis cryptica is a species of soldier beetles native to Europe.

References

Cantharidae
Beetles described in 1947
Beetles of Europe